LZI may refer to:
 Leibniz-Zentrum für Informatik
 Zeppelin LZ1 - an Imperial German rigid dirigeable airship
 Led Zeppelin I – a 1969 album by Led Zeppelin.
 Landing Zone 1, SpaceX rocket landing pad in Space Coast, Florida, USA

See also
 LZ1 (disambiguation)